Fatherland and Constitution (PeC) is a left-wing nationalist and souverainist political party in Italy. It was founded in September 2018 by Stefano Fassina, a member of the Chamber of Deputies for Free and Equal.

Fassina is an Italian economist and was a former member of left-wing of the pro-Europeanist Democratic Party (PD). He later assumed more critical views on the European Union (UE), formed Future to the Left (FaS) and was a founding member of Italian Left (SI) in 2015. Fassina has proposed a "controlled disintegration of the Eurozone".

In September 2019, PeC supported the formation of the second government of Giuseppe Conte, composed by the Five Star Movement, PD and LeU.

Leadership 
 Leader: Stefano Fassina (2018–present)

References

2018 establishments in Italy
Political parties established in 2018
Eurosceptic parties in Italy
Far-left politics in Italy
Italian nationalism
Left-wing nationalist parties
Left-wing politics in Italy
Nationalist parties in Italy
Progressive parties